Amie Dicke (born 1 April 1978, Rotterdam) is an artist based in Amsterdam.

She completed her degree in Fine Art from the Willem de Kooning Academy of Fine Arts in Rotterdam. Dicke is known for her cut-out versions of fashion photos taken from glossy magazines.

Dicke's work has been shown internationally at galleries and museums including the Schirn Kunsthalle  in Frankfurt, Germany, Tate Modern and Project Space 176 in London, FLAG Art Foundation, New York, and Art Centre Silkeborg Bad in Denmark.

Her work is featured in several collections including the Zabludowicz Collection, Collection Rik Reinking, Takashi Murakami and the City Collection of Rotterdam through the Museum Boijmans van Beuningen.

References

1978 births
Living people
21st-century Dutch women artists
Artists from Rotterdam
Willem de Kooning Academy alumni